Sebastián Fernández (born 8 September 1973) is an Argentine professional golfer.

Fernández was born in Buenos Aires. He worked as a caddie in Buenos Aires, before turning professional in 1991. He won the Argentine Tour Order of Merit in 2000. He won three Argentine PGA Championships, in 1991, 2001 and 2005, the first as an 18-year-old, and also came second in 2003.

Fernández competed on the Challenge Tour from 2003 to 2007, winning one tournament, the Costa Rica Open in 2003, and finishing second in the Skandia PGA Open (Sweden) in 2003, the Costa Rica Open in 2005 and the Challenge of Ireland in 2006.

Seventh place on the Challenge Tour Order of Merit in 2003 enabled Fernández to play on the European Tour the following year. He managed a best finish of 16th position in the BMW International Open, and just missed out on retaining his tour card, ending the season 136th on the money list. In 2008 he played on the Nationwide Tour, achieving a best of 5th place in the New Zealand PGA Championship.

Professional wins (20)

Challenge Tour wins (1)

1Co-sanctioned by the Tour de las Américas

Challenge Tour playoff record (1–1)

PGA Tour Latinoamérica wins (1)

Tour de las Américas wins (3)
 2002 Tikal Trophy Guatemala
 2010 Peru Open, Carlos Franco Invitational1
1Co-sanctioned by the TPG Tour

TPG Tour wins (3)

1Co-sanctioned by the Tour de las Américas

Argentine wins (12)
 1991 Argentine PGA Championship
 1992 Ituzaingo Grand Prix, Nautico Hacoaj Grand Prix
 1993 SHA Grand Prix
 1995 Pinamar Open
 1998 Las Delicias Grand Prix
 2000 Praderas Grand Prix, Bariloche Grand Prix, Acantilados Grand Prix
 2001 Argentine PGA Championship
 2005 Argentine PGA Championship
 2009 YPF Classic Mendoza Open

Other wins (1)
 1996 Carmel Open (Colombia)

External links
 
 
 

Argentine male golfers
PGA Tour golfers
PGA Tour Latinoamérica golfers
European Tour golfers
Sportspeople from Buenos Aires
1973 births
Living people